H Centauri (H Cen), also known as V945 Centauri, is probable triple star system located in the constellation Centaurus. From parallax measurements, it is located 113 parsecs (370 light years) from the sun. It is a member of the Lower Centaurus–Crux (LCC) subgroup of the Scorpius–Centaurus association.

This system is a double-lined spectroscopic binary formed by two B-type main-sequence star with spectral types B7V and B8.5V. They are in a close (but detached) circular orbit with a period of 0.6496 days and a separation of 5.63 solar radii. Observed at an inclination of 24°, the system is an ellipsoidal variable whose apparent visual magnitude varies from 5.14 to 5.17 over the course of an orbit as the star's visible surface area changes. The system's spectrum contains a third set of spectral lines that are probably from a third star, also of type B.

References

External links
Alcyone 
Wikisky

Centaurus (constellation)
B-type main-sequence stars
Centauri, H
Centauri, V945
CD-50 07394
112409
063210
4913
Triple star systems
Spectroscopic binaries
Rotating ellipsoidal variables
Lower Centaurus Crux